John Raymond Martyr (25 May 1932 – 18 June 2021) was an Australian politician.

Born in Melbourne, he was a political and economic consultant before entering politics. Martyr had a long history of involvement with the Australian Labor Party from his late teens, but due to his involvement with the anti-communist Roman Catholic "Movement" under the aegis of B. A. Santamaria, he was expelled from the ALP.

He became an organiser and candidate with the Democratic Labor Party, and on 14 April 1956 married Doris Dent, a local ALP branch secretary and Police Union staffer who was also involved with the Movement.

In 1962, John and Doris Martyr moved to Western Australia, where John became State Secretary of the DLP. He eventually joined the Liberal Party, and in 1975, he was elected to the Australian House of Representatives as the Liberal member for Swan, defeating sitting Labor member Adrian Bennett. He held the seat until his defeat by Kim Beazley in 1980.

On 11 March 1981, he was appointed to the Australian Senate to fill the casual vacancy created by the retirement of Allan Rocher. He was defeated, however, in the 1983 election.

References

1932 births
2021 deaths
Liberal Party of Australia members of the Parliament of Australia
Members of the Australian House of Representatives for Swan
Members of the Australian House of Representatives
Members of the Australian Senate for Western Australia
Members of the Australian Senate
Democratic Labor Party (historical) politicians
20th-century Australian politicians
Politicians from Melbourne